Edward Hackett (July 6, 1840 – December 23, 1916) was a merchant and political figure in Prince Edward Island. He represented 1st Prince in the Legislative Assembly of Prince Edward Island from 1876 to 1878. He subsequently served in the House of Commons of Canada, representing Prince County from 1878 to 1887, and West Prince from 1896 to 1897 and from 1900 to 1904. He was a Liberal-Conservative member.

He was born in Tignish, Prince Edward Island, the son of Thomas Hackett and Ellen Condon, immigrants from Ireland. He was first employed as a bookkeeper for a store before opening his own business in 1864, also entering the fish trade. In 1860, he married Hannah Maria Fitzgibbon. He served as justice of the peace for Prince County from 1872 to 1876. Hackett was defeated in bids for reelection to the House of Commons in 1887, 1897 and 1898.

External links 

The Canadian biographical dictionary and portrait gallery of eminent and self-made men ... (1881)
 The Canadian parliamentary companion and annual register, 1879, Charles Herbert Mackintosh 

1840 births
1916 deaths
People from Tignish, Prince Edward Island
Liberal Party of Canada MPs
Members of the House of Commons of Canada from Prince Edward Island
Progressive Conservative Party of Prince Edward Island MLAs
Prince Edward Island Liberal Party MLAs
Canadian justices of the peace